A chieftain is a tribal chief or village head.

Chieftain or Chieftains may refer also to:

 Chieftain (tank), the main battle tank of the British Army during the 1960s and 1970s
 The Chieftain, a 1894 comic opera by Arthur Sullivan and F. C. Burnand.
 The Chieftain (film), a 1984 Norwegian drama film
 Chieftains Museum, Cherokee museum in Rome, Georgia
 The Chieftains, a traditional Irish musical group
 , a UK passenger ferry
 Chieftain Products, a former Canadian toy and game company
 Chieftain, a line of computers sold by Smoke Signal Broadcasting

See also 
 Piper PA-31 Navajo Chieftain, a light aircraft
 Chief (disambiguation)